= Bacacheri Park =

Park located in Curitiba, state of Parana, Brazil

Coordinates: 25.390°S 49.230°W

Bacacheri Park is a park located in Curitiba, state of Paraná, Brazil
